Yang Chao (born 3 August 1993) is a Chinese footballer currently playing as a goalkeeper for Sichuan Jiuniu.

Career statistics

Club
.

References

1993 births
Living people
Chinese footballers
Association football goalkeepers
China League Two players
China League One players
Guangdong South China Tiger F.C. players
Sichuan Jiuniu F.C. players